Men of the Sky may refer to:

Men of the Sky (1931 film), American pre-Code musical drama
Men of the Sky (1942 film), American WWII morale boosting short in Technicolor

See also
Sky People (disambiguation)
Men Against the Sky, 1940 American drama film
The Man in the Sky, 1957 British suspense film